MV Sound of Scarba is a car and passenger ferry, operated by Western Ferries on the River Clyde between Gourock and Dunoon, Scotland

History
Sound of Scarba was built by Ferguson Shipbuilders of Port Glasgow, Scotland at a reported cost of £2.5 million. She was launched on 12 March 2001 by employee Laura Meade and entered service on 4 May 2001.

Layout
Sound of Scarba has a single car deck with bow and stern ramps, and a passenger lounge.

Service
Sound of Scarba operates Western Ferries Clyde service between McInroy's Point (Gourock) and Hunters Quay (Dunoon).

Footnotes

External links

2001 ships
Ferries of Scotland